Zolakar, is a village in the Martuni Municipality of the Gegharkunik Province of Armenia.

Etymology 
The village was known as Zolakhach until 1935.

History 
The village was founded in 1829 by emigrants from Alashkert. Zolakar is home to the historic St. George's Church, Tukh Manuk chapels, as well as Bronze Age cemeteries. In the center of the village is a funerary monument.

Gallery

References

External links 

 
 

Populated places in Gegharkunik Province